Friedrich Kühne (24 April 1870 – 13 October 1959), born Franz Michna, was a German film actor of the silent era. He appeared in more than 100 films between 1913 and 1957.

Selected filmography

 The Iron Cross (1914)
 Detektiv Braun (1914)
 Der Hund von Baskerville (The Hound of the Baskervilles) (1914) as Stapleton
 The Silent Mill (1914)
 Tales of Hoffmann (1916)
 Ferdinand Lassalle (1918)
 The Prisoner of Dahomey (1918)
 Alraune, die Henkerstochter, genannt die rote Hanne (1918)
 Opium (1919)
 Veritas Vincit (1919)
 The Spiders (1919-1920, 2 parts)
 Judith Trachtenberg (1920)
 The Song of the Puszta (1920)
 Lady Hamilton (1921)
 The Terror of the Red Mill (1921)
 The Black Panther (1921)
 Danton (1921)
 Children of Darkness (1921)
 Hashish, the Paradise of Hell (1921)
 Treasure of the Aztecs (1921)
 Die Gezeichneten (1922)
 The False Dimitri (1922)
 Bigamy (1922)
 The Lodging House for Gentleman (1922)
 Othello (1922)
 Lola Montez, the King's Dancer (1922)
 A Dying Nation (1922)
 The Testament of Joe Sivers (1922)
 The Earl of Essex (1922)
 The Man in the Iron Mask (1923)
 The Unknown Tomorrow (1923)
 A Night's Adventure (1923)
 Orient Fever (1923)
 Prater (1924)
 Carlos and Elisabeth (1924)
 By Order of Pompadour (1924)
 Goetz von Berlichingen of the Iron Hand (1925)
 The Man on the Comet (1925)
 Living Buddhas (1925)
 The Golden Calf (1925)
 Lützow's Wild Hunt (1927)
 The Transformation of Dr. Bessel (1927)
 The Flute Concert of Sanssouci (1930)
 Frauenschicksale (1952)
 Anna Susanna (1953)

References

External links
 

1870 births
1959 deaths
Actors from Olomouc
Moravian-German people
German male film actors
German male silent film actors
20th-century German male actors